Šljivovac is a village in the Kragujevac city area in the Šumadija District, Serbia. According to the 2011 census there were 417 inhabitants.

References

Populated places in Šumadija District